is the goddess of dawn, mirth, meditation, revelry and the arts in the Shinto religion of Japan, and the wife of fellow-god Sarutahiko Ōkami.  She famously helped draw out the missing sun deity, Amaterasu Omikami, when she had hid herself in a cave. Her name can also be pronounced as Ama-no-Uzume. She is also known as Ōmiyanome-no-Ōkami, an inari kami possibly due to her relationship with her husband.
She is also known as Ame-no-Uzume-no-Mikoto, The Great Persuader, and The Heavenly Alarming Female.  She is depicted in kyōgen farce as Okame, a woman who revels in her sensuality.

Mythology

Amaterasu and the cave 
Amaterasu's brother, the storm god Susano'o, had vandalized her rice fields, threw a flayed horse at her loom, and brutally killed one of her maidens due to a quarrel between them. In turn, Amaterasu became furious with him and retreated into the Heavenly Rock Cave, Amano-Iwato. The world, without the illumination of the sun, became dark and the gods could not lure Amaterasu out of her hiding place.

The clever Uzume overturned a tub near the cave entrance and began to dance on it, tearing off her clothing in front of the other deities. They considered this so comical that they laughed heartily at the sight. This dance is said to have founded the Japanese ritual dance, Kagura.

Uzume had hung a bronze mirror and a beautiful jewel of polished jade. Amaterasu heard them, and peered out to see what the commotion was about. When she opened the cave, she saw the jewel and her glorious reflection in a mirror which Uzume had placed on a tree, and slowly came out from her clever hiding spot.

At that moment, the god Ame-no-Tajikarawo-no-mikoto dashed forth and closed the cave behind her, refusing to budge so that she could no longer retreat. Another god tied a magic shimenawa across the entrance.  The deities Ame-no-Koyane-no-mikoto and Ame-no-Futodama-no-mikoto then asked Amaterasu to rejoin the divine. She agreed, and light was restored to the earth.

Uzume and Sarutahiko 

Amaterasu orders Uzume to accompany her grandson Ninigi on his journey to earth. They head to Ame-no-ukihashi ("floating bridge of heaven") so they could head to earth but they are blocked by Sarutahiko. Uzume comes and persuades Sarutahiko to let Ninigi pass, in other versions of the story Uzume flirts with Sarutahiko. 

Later, Uzume and Sarutahiko fall in love and get married. Together, they found the Sarume clan.

Worship 

Ame-no-Uzume-no-Mikoto is still worshiped today as a Shinto kami, spirits indigenous to Japan. 

There are many shrines dedicated to the goddess including Chiyo shrine, Tsubaki America Shrine and Tsubaki Grand Shrine.

Similarities with Vedic religion
According to Michael Witzel, Uzume is most closely related to the Vedic goddess Ushas (uṣás), a descendant of the Proto-Indo-European goddess Hausos. Both goddesses share many similarities such as the cave (Vala/Iwato) and the exposure of breasts as a sign of friendship. Witzel proposed that the Japanese and Vedic religions are much more closely related compared to other mythologies under what he calls Laurasian mythology, and that the two myths may go back to the Indo-Iranian period, around 2000 BCE. This would make Uzume analogous to the Greek goddess Eos and the Roman goddess Aurora.

References

External links 

A substantial article on this subject
Amaterasu and Uzume, Goddesses of Japan, at Goddess Gift
A one-paragraph glossary entry in Italian

Japanese goddesses
Solar goddesses
Shinto kami
Trickster goddesses
Arts goddesses
Dawn goddesses
Amatsukami